Pawtoberfest is a fundraising event organized by the Humane Society of the Pikes Peak Region. Consisting of a 5K run/walk followed by an outdoor festival, this event currently takes place in Colorado Springs, Colorado during September. Bear Creek Regional Park is the current location of this multi-faceted event. As of 2015, the race and festival have accumulated over 1,200 attendees (along with one or two canine companions each).

History 
Pawtoberfest was conceived as a promotional event by the HSPPR in an effort to encourage local pet adoption. The first Pawtoberfest in 2009 consisted of the K9-5K (then considered a separate event) on the streets of downtown Colorado Springs, followed by a festival on the porch of the Nosh restaurant. In 2010 and 2011, the event was held at America the Beautiful Park. Although typically an outdoor event, the festival portion of Pawtoberfest was held in the Norris-Penrose Event Center in 2012 due to weather complications. Subsequent races have been hosted by Bear Creek Regional Park; however, the event center is still utilized for its parking lot. A dog-friendly shuttle service is offered to take participants to the start line, or directly to the festival.

Recognition 
Animal Planet acknowledged Pawtoberfest in its Top 10 Dog Festivals Summer Happy Everything list within its first few years. More recently, several local Starbucks employees volunteered as an Starbucks Community Service project.

References

Fundraising events
2009 establishments in Colorado